The Chiefs–Raiders rivalry is a National Football League (NFL) rivalry between the Kansas City Chiefs and the Las Vegas Raiders. The rivalry between the Chiefs and Raiders is considered to be one of the NFL's most bitter rivalries.

History
The teams first met in 1960 when the Chiefs were known as the Dallas Texans. The Texans defeated the Raiders 34–16 in the team's first game at Oakland, then the Raiders defeated the Texans 20–19 at Dallas.

The rivalry did not become so apparent until the Kansas City Athletics baseball team moved to Oakland, California, in 1967. In 1969, the Kansas City Royals expansion team was placed in the same division as the Athletics. The 1966 Chiefs team participated in the first AFL-NFL World Championship Game, later known as the Super Bowl. The Chiefs and Raiders had identical 12–2 records in 1968 and faced off in a playoff game to decide who would go to face the New York Jets for the AFL Championship. The Raiders won, 41–6.

The following year, in 1969, the Raiders beat the Chiefs twice in the regular season and went on to win the AFL Western Conference title. The teams met in the 1969 AFL Championship Game at Oakland and the underdog Chiefs won 17–7. The Chiefs participated in Super Bowl IV a week later and defeated the NFL's heavily favored Minnesota Vikings. It was not until 1976 that Oakland won their first Super Bowl championship.

In the first meeting between the teams during the 1970 NFL season—both teams' first in the newly merged NFL—the Chiefs held a 17–14 lead late in the fourth quarter and appeared ready to run out the clock. Chiefs quarterback Len Dawson rolled right and gained enough yardage for a first down, and as he fell to the ground, Raiders defensive end Ben Davidson dove into Dawson with his helmet; in retaliation, Davidson was attacked by Chiefs wide receiver Otis Taylor. After a bench-clearing brawl, Davidson and Taylor were ejected, and the penalties that were called nullified the first down under the rules at the time. Kansas City was forced to punt. The Raiders took advantage, as George Blanda made a 48-yard field goal with 8 seconds left to secure a 17–17 tie. The tie proved to be costly for the Chiefs, as Oakland clinched their first AFC West championship with a 20–6 victory in Oakland in Week 13. Due to this incident, the NFL changed the rules so that Davidson's personal foul would have been enforced at the end of the play, and Taylor's penalty would have been assessed only after the Chiefs had been awarded a first down.

The Chiefs defeated the Raiders 42–10 in the 1975 season, prompting the Chiefs' live horse mascot Warpaint to circle the field after each touchdown scored. After the game, Raiders coach John Madden said "We couldn't beat the Chiefs, but we damn near killed their horse."

The Raiders won two more Super Bowl titles in 1980 and 1983 while the Chiefs were considered to be one of the worst teams in the NFL. The Raiders won most of the games between the 1970s and 1980s. Following their victory in Super Bowl IV, the Chiefs returned to the playoffs in 1971, but lost in double overtime to the Miami Dolphins in the divisional round in the longest game in NFL history, the final game at Kansas City's Municipal Stadium. Following that loss, Kansas City did not return to the playoffs until 1986.

In the final game of the 1999 season, the Chiefs and Raiders faced off at Kansas City. A win for the Chiefs would put them in the playoffs. A game plagued by special teams mistakes for the Chiefs, including three attempted kickoffs that ended up out of bounds by kickoff specialist Jon Baker, helped keep the Raiders in the game and stop the Chiefs from sealing the victory. The game went into overtime and, helped by favorable field position after the third and final kickoff out of bounds, former Chief Rich Gannon drove the Raiders into Chiefs territory, setting up the game-winning field goal and knocking the Chiefs out of the playoffs, their first win at Arrowhead since 1988.

On October 21, 2007, the Chiefs defeated the Raiders for a record ninth straight victory. On November 25, 2007, the Raiders defeated the Chiefs in Arrowhead for Oakland's first victory over Kansas City since December 23, 2002.

On September 14, 2008, the Raiders defeated the Chiefs 23–8 for the second straight time in Kansas City. Rookie Darren McFadden compiled 210 rushing yards and a touchdown. On November 30, 2008, the Chiefs defeated the Raiders for the sixth straight time in Oakland.

On September 20, 2009, the Raiders defeated the Chiefs 13–10, in Kansas City for the third straight time. The Chiefs became one of the few teams to lose to quarterback JaMarcus Russell.
On November 15, 2009, the Chiefs defeated the Raiders 16–10 in Oakland Coliseum for the Chiefs' seventh straight victory in Oakland.

On November 7, 2010, the Raiders defeated the Chiefs in OT 23–20 in a match-up that revived the Chiefs–Raiders rivalry. It marked the 99th time these teams have met in the regular season and 102nd overall. On January 2, 2011, the Raiders defeated the Chiefs in Kansas City for the fourth straight time, 31–10, to finish a sweep of the AFC West.

On October 3, 2011, a Raiders fan filed a lawsuit against the Chiefs and two unidentified Chiefs fans, claiming that security did nothing as he was beaten during a brawl at Kansas City in 2009.

The Chiefs broke Oakland's six-game winning streak in Kansas City on October 13, 2013, when they defeated the Raiders, 24–7, in a game where Kansas City set a then world record for the loudest open-air venue at over 137 dB.

On November 20, 2014, the Raiders snapped a 16-game losing streak in Oakland against the Chiefs while Kansas City was in a four-game winning streak the week after the Chiefs defeated the defending Super Bowl champions, the Seattle Seahawks. The loss ended up costing Kansas City a playoff berth.

In 2015, the Kansas City Chiefs swept the season series between these two teams.

In 2016, both teams were at the top of the AFC for the entire season, with Oakland securing their first winning season and first playoff appearance since 2002. The Chiefs beat Oakland twice, 26–10 in Oakland and in Kansas City 21–13. Both teams ended the regular season with a 12–4 record and with the series sweep, Kansas City won the AFC West and a first round bye while Oakland was relegated to Wild Card status and the fifth seed in the AFC playoffs.

The Chiefs and Raiders met for a Thursday Night match-up on October 19, 2017 in Oakland, with the Chiefs at a 5–1 record and the Raiders at a 2–4 record. The Raiders won the game 31–30 with a touchdown pass at the very end of the game, which followed two Chiefs defensive penalties, also including a scuffle between the two teams that led to Raiders running back Marshawn Lynch getting ejected. The game snapped a four-game losing streak for Oakland in the season, and also a five-game losing streak against the Chiefs in the rivalry.

In Week 5 of the 2020 season, the rivalry between the two teams was renewed when the 2-2 Raiders went to Arrowhead Stadium and upset the undefeated Chiefs 40-32, snapping a 5-game losing streak against the Chiefs dating back to 2017. It was the Raiders’ first win in Arrowhead since 2012, with Derek Carr passing for 347 yards and three touchdowns, while Patrick Mahomes had 340 yards and two touchdowns, but had a costly third-quarter interception that led to a critical Raiders touchdown. It was Mahomes’ first loss to the Raiders, and first loss since losing to the Tennessee Titans in Week 10 of the 2019 season.

On November 22, 2020, the two teams met in Las Vegas for the first time on Sunday Night Football. With 1:07 left in the game, Derek Carr threw a touchdown pass to Jason Witten to give the Raiders a 31-28 lead, but Patrick Mahomes lead a 75-yard drive culminating in a 23-yard touchdown pass to Travis Kelce with 28 seconds left that gave the Chiefs a 35-31 win, officially renewing a spark in the rivalry between the two teams. The Chiefs went on to finish the season 14-2, losing to the Buccaneers in Super Bowl LV, while the Raiders, who were 6-3 leading up to this game, began a painful late-season collapse, as they would lose four of their last six games to end the season 8-8 and out of the playoffs.

Season-by-season results 

|-
| 1960
| Tie 1–1
| style="| Raiders  20–19
| style="| Texans  34–16
| Tie  1–1
| Inaugural season for both franchises and the AFL.
|-
| 1961
| style="| 
| style="| Texans  43–11
| style="| Texans  42–35
| Texans  3–1
| 
|-
| 1962
| style="| 
| style="| Texans  35–7
| style="| Texans  26–16
| Texans  5–1
| Texans win 1962 AFL Championship.
|-
| 1963
| style="| 
| style="| Raiders  22–7
| style="| Raiders  10–7
| Chiefs  5–3
| Texans move to Kansas City and become the Kansas City Chiefs.
|-
| 1964
| style="| 
| style="| Chiefs  42–7
| style="| Chiefs  21–9
| Chiefs  7–3
| 
|-
| 1965
| Tie 1–1
| style="| Chiefs  14–7
| style="| Raiders  37–10
| Chiefs  8–4
| 
|-
| 1966
| Tie 1–1
| style="| Raiders  34–14
| style="| Chiefs  32–10
| Chiefs  9–5
| Chiefs win 1966 AFL Championship, lose Super Bowl I.
|-
| 1967
| style="| 
| style="| Raiders  44–22
| style="| Raiders  23–21
| Chiefs  9–7
| Raiders win 1967 AFL Championship, lose Super Bowl II.
|-
| 1968
| Tie 1–1
| style="| Chiefs  24–10
| style="| Raiders  30–21
| Chiefs  10–8
| Raiders lose 1968 AFL Championship.
|- style="background:#f2f2f2; font-weight:bold;"
|  1968 Playoffs
| style="| 
|  
| style="| Raiders  41–6
|  Chiefs  10–9
|  AFL Western Division Playoff.  First postseason meeting between the two teams.
|-
| 1969
| style="| 
| style="| Raiders  27–24
| style="| Raiders  10–6
| Raiders  11–10
| Chiefs win 1969 AFL Championship, win Super Bowl IV.
|- style="background:#f2f2f2; font-weight:bold;"
|  1969 Playoffs
| style="| 
|  
| style="| Chiefs  17–7
|  Tie  11–11
|  AFL Championship Game. Chiefs become first Super Bowl representative (and champion) to not win their respective division.
|-

|-
| 
| style="| 
| Tie  17–17
| style="| Raiders  20–6
| Raiders  12–11–1
| AFL-NFL merger.  Both teams placed in AFC West.  Late in the game in Kansas City, Ben Davidson and Otis Taylor fight leads to a bench clearing brawl.  Offsetting penalties took a first down away from the Chiefs, forcing them to punt and allowing the Raiders to kick a game-tying field goal.
|-
| 
| style="| 
| style="| Chiefs  16–14
| Tie  20–20
| Tie  12–12–2
| Most recent tie game in the series.
|-
| 
| Tie 1–1
| style="| Chiefs  27–14
| style="| Raiders  26–3
| Tie  13–13–2
| Chiefs open Arrowhead Stadium. Kansas City's win was its first at Arrowhead before a record crowd of 82,390.
|-
| 
| Tie 1–1
| style="| Chiefs  16–6
| style="| Raiders  37–7
| Tie  14–14–2
| 
|-
| 
| style="| 
| style="| Raiders  7–6
| style="| Raiders  27–7
| Raiders  16–14–2
| 
|-
| 
| Tie 1–1
| style="| Chiefs  42–10
| style="| Raiders  28–20
| Raiders  17–15–2
| 
|-
| 
| style="| 
| style="| Raiders  24–21
| style="| Raiders  21–10
| Raiders  19–15–2
| Raiders win Super Bowl XI.Game in Kansas City is first meeting aired on Monday Night Football.
|-
| 
| style="| 
| style="| Raiders  37–28
| style="| Raiders  21–20
| Raiders  21–15–2
| 
|-
| 
| style="| 
| style="| Raiders  20–10
| style="| Raiders  28–6
| Raiders  23–15–2
| Raiders win seven straight meetings.
|-
| 
| style="| 
| style="| Chiefs  35–7
| style="| Chiefs  24–21
| Raiders  23–17–2
| Chiefs' first win in Oakland since 1969 AFL Championship; first Kansas City sweep since 1964. 
|-

|-
| 
| Tie  1–1
| style="| Raiders  27–14
| style="| Chiefs  31–17
| Raiders  24–18–2
| Raiders win Super Bowl XV.
|-
| 
| style="| 
| style="| Chiefs  27–0
| style="| Chiefs  28–17
| Raiders  24–20–2
| 
|-
| 
| style="| 
| style="| Raiders  21–17
| no game
| Raiders  25–20–2
| Raiders move from Oakland to Los Angeles.  Game in Los Angeles was cancelled due to the Players strike reducing season to 9 games.
|-
| 
| style="| 
| style="| Raiders  28–20
| style="| Raiders  21–20
| Raiders  27–20–2
| Raiders win Super Bowl XVIII.
|-
| 
| style="| 
| style="| Raiders  22–20
| style="| Raiders  17–7
| Raiders  29–20–2
| 
|-
| 
| Tie 1–1
| style="| Chiefs  36–20
| style="| Raiders  19–10
| Raiders  30–21–2
| 
|-
| 
| Tie 1–1
| style="| Raiders  24–17
| style="| Chiefs  20–17
| Raiders  31–22–2
| 
|-
| 
| Tie 1–1
| style="| Chiefs  16–10
| style="| Raiders  35–17
| Raiders  32–23–2
| Game in Los Angeles played with replacement players during NFL players strike.
|-
| 
| style="| 
| style="| Raiders  27–17
| style="| Raiders  17–10
| Raiders  34–23–2
| 
|-
| 
| Tie 1–1
| style="| Chiefs  24–19
| style="| Raiders  20–14
| Raiders  35–24–2
|

|-
| 
| style="| 
| style="| Chiefs  9–7
| style="| Chiefs  27–24
| Raiders  35–26–2
| 
|-
| 
| style="| 
| style="| Chiefs  24–21
| style="| Chiefs  27–21
| Raiders  35–28–2
| 
|- style="background:#f2f2f2; font-weight:bold;"
|  1991 Playoffs
| style="| 
| style="| Chiefs  10–6
| 
|  Raiders  35–29–2
|  AFC Wild Card playoffs.  Third overall postseason meeting, but the only postseason meeting since the AFL-NFL merger.
|-
| 
| Tie 1–1
| style="| Chiefs  27–7
| style="| Raiders  28–7
| Raiders  36–30–2
| 
|-
| 
| style="| 
| style="| Chiefs  24–9
| style="| Chiefs  31–20
| Raiders  36–32–2
| 
|-
| 
| style="| 
| style="| Chiefs  13–3
| style="| Chiefs  19–9
| Raiders  36–34–2
| 
|-
| 
| style="| 
| style="| Chiefs  23–17(OT)
| style="| Chiefs  29–23
| Tie  36–36–2
| Raiders move from Los Angeles back to Oakland.
|-
| 
| Tie 1–1
| style="| Chiefs  19–3
| style="| Raiders  26–7
| Tie  37–37–2
|  
|-
| 
| style="| 
| style="| Chiefs  30–0
| style="| Chiefs  28–27
| Chiefs  39–37–2
| 
|-
| 
| style="| 
| style="| Chiefs  28–8
| style="| Chiefs  31–24
| Chiefs  41–37–2
| Chiefs win 11 straight home games (1989–98).Game in Oakland last for Chiefs coach Marty Schottenheimer.
|-
| 
| Tie 1–1
| style="| Raiders  41–38(OT)
| style="| Chiefs  37–34
| Chiefs  42–38–2
| Chiefs win 19 of 21 meetings dating back to 1989.  Raiders win in Kansas City, the final game of the regular season, to keep the Chiefs out of the playoffs. Game in Kansas City also the last for Chiefs star linebacker Derrick Thomas, who died 37 days later from injuries suffered in an automobile accident.
|-

|-
| 
| style="| 
| style="| Raiders  20–17
| style="| Raiders  49–31
| Chiefs  42–40–2
| First Raiders sweep since 1988. 
|-
| 
| style="| 
| style="| Raiders  27–24
| style="| Raiders  28–26
| Tie  42–42–2
| Game in Kansas City is season opener and played with replacement officials.
|-
| 
| Tie 1–1
| style="| Chiefs  20–10
| style="| Raiders  24–0
| Tie  43–43–2 
| Raiders lose Super Bowl XXXVII.
|-
| 
| style="| 
| style="| Chiefs  27–24
| style="| Chiefs  17–10
| Chiefs  45–43–2
| 
|-
| 
| style="| 
| style="| Chiefs  31–30
| style="| Chiefs  34–27
| Chiefs  47–43–2
| Game in Kansas City played on Christmas.
|-
| 
| style="| 
| style="| Chiefs  27–23
| style="| Chiefs  23–17
| Chiefs  49–43–2
|
|-
| 
| style="| 
| style="| Chiefs  17–13
| style="| Chiefs  20–9
| Chiefs  51–43–2
| 
|-
| 
| Tie 1–1
| style="| Raiders  20–17
| style="| Chiefs  12–10
| Chiefs  52–44–2 
| Chiefs win nine straight meetings.
|-
| 
| Tie 1–1
| style="| Raiders  23–8
| style="| Chiefs  20–13
| Chiefs  53–45–2 
| 
|-
| 
| Tie 1–1
| style="| Raiders  13–10
| style="| Chiefs  16–10
| Chiefs  54–46–2 
| Chiefs win seven straight games in Oakland.
|-

|-
| 
| style="| 
| style="| Raiders  31–10
| style="| Raiders  23–20(OT)
| Chiefs  54–48–2
| Raiders sweep division but miss the playoffs, an NFL first. 
|-
| 
| Tie 1–1
| style="| Raiders  16–13(OT)
| style="| Chiefs  28–0
| Chiefs  55–49–2 
| 
|-
| 
| style="| 
| style="| Raiders  26–16
| style="| Raiders  15–0
| Chiefs  55–51–2
| Raiders win six straight meetings in Kansas City.
|-
| 
| style="| 
| style="| Chiefs  24–7
| style="| Chiefs  56–31
| Chiefs  57–51–2
| The Chiefs' 56–31 win in Oakland is the highest scoring game in the rivalry (87 points).
|-
| 
| Tie 1–1
| style="| Chiefs  31–13
| style="| Raiders  24–20
| Chiefs  58–52–2 
|
|-
| 
| style="| 
| style="| Chiefs  23–17
| style="| Chiefs  34–20
| Chiefs  60–52–2
| 
|-
| 
| style="| 
| style="| Chiefs  21–13
| style="| Chiefs  26–10
| Chiefs  62–52–2
|
|-
| 
| Tie 1–1
| style="| Chiefs  26–15
| style="| Raiders  31–30
| Chiefs  63–53–2
| Raiders win game in Oakland after back-to-back holding calls against the Chiefs which allowed 2 consecutive untimed downs. 
|-
| 
| style="| 
| style="| Chiefs  35–3
| style="| Chiefs  40–33
| Chiefs  65–53–2
| Chiefs clinch the AFC West and the AFC's #1 seed with their home win in week 17.
|-
| 
| style="| 
| style="| Chiefs  40–9
| style="| Chiefs  28–10
| Chiefs  67–53–2
| Chiefs win seven straight home meetings.  Chiefs win Super Bowl LIV.
|-

|-
| 
| Tie 1–1
| style="| Raiders  40–32
| style="| Chiefs  35–31
| Chiefs  68–54–2
| Raiders relocate to Las Vegas, Nevada. Raiders' first win in Kansas City since 2012. Chiefs lose Super Bowl LV.
|-
| 
| style="| 
| style="| Chiefs  48–9
| style="| Chiefs  41–14
| Chiefs  70–54–2
| 
|-
| 
| style="| 
| style="| Chiefs  30–29 
| style="| Chiefs  31–13 
| Chiefs  72–54–2
| Chiefs clinch the AFC's #1 seed with their road win in week 18. Chiefs win Super Bowl LVII.
|- 

|-
| AFL regular season
| Tie 10–10
| Tie 5–5
| Tie 5–5
|
|-
| NFL regular season
| style="|
| Chiefs 32–20–1 
| Chiefs 28–23–1
| 
|-
| AFL and NFL regular season
| style="|
| Chiefs 37–25–1 
| Chiefs 33–28–1
| 
|-
| AFL and NFL postseason
| style="|
| Chiefs 1–0
| Tie 1–1
| AFC Wild Card playoffs: 1991. AFL Western Divisional playoff: 1968. AFL Championship Game: 1969.
|-
| Regular and postseason 
| style="|
| Chiefs 38–25–1 
| Chiefs 34–29–1
| 72 wins by the Chiefs are the most by one team against the Raiders.
|-

Connections between the teams
 Quarterback Rich Gannon, who was the Chiefs' starting quarterback in the late 1990s signed with the Raiders for the 1999 season and two years later was named NFL MVP.
 Wide receiver Andre Rison played for the Chiefs before getting cut prior to the 2000 NFL season. He signed with Oakland later that year.
 Running back Marcus Allen played for the Raiders in Los Angeles and led the Raiders to victory in Super Bowl XVIII. Allen signed with the Chiefs for the 1993 season after a feud with Raider Managing General Partner Al Davis became public. Allen later reportedly asked to be inducted into the Pro Football Hall of Fame as a member of the Chiefs, even though unlike the National Baseball Hall of Fame, the Pro Football Hall of Fame doesn't induct players on a certain team. Allen did receive his Hall of Fame ring in a ceremony at halftime of a Chiefs game in 2003 at Arrowhead Stadium in Kansas City.
 Backup quarterback Tom Flores won a Super Bowl with the Chiefs in 1969, but never started in Kansas City. Flores became head coach of the Raiders 10 years later and led the team to two Super Bowl titles.
 Former Chiefs head coach and defensive coordinator Gunther Cunningham spent four years with the Los Angeles Raiders (1991–94) as the team's defensive coordinator. He joined the Chiefs in 1995.
 Cornerback Albert Lewis and running back Harvey Williams started their careers in Kansas City but were traded to the Raiders in 1994.
 Quarterback JaMarcus Russell and wide receiver Dwayne Bowe hold many records while attending Louisiana State University. In the 2007 NFL Draft, Russell would be drafted to the Raiders (#1 overall) and Bowe would be drafted to the Chiefs (#23 overall). Also, during the following draft (2008 NFL Draft), LSU's defensive tackle Glenn Dorsey would also be drafted to the Chiefs (#5 overall). Even in 2009, LSU's defensive end Tyson Jackson would be drafted by the Chiefs in the first round.
 Defensive tackle Terdell Sands was drafted by the Chiefs in 2001. After a few seasons, Sands signed with the Raiders to become their starter on the defensive line.
 Raiders running back Bo Jackson spent most of his Major League Baseball career with the Kansas City Royals, whose Kauffman Stadium (Royals Stadium from 1973–93) shares the same parking lot with Arrowhead at the Harry S. Truman Sports Complex.
 In 1962, the Chiefs traded their original quarterback Cotton Davidson to the Raiders for the first overall selection in the 1963 AFL Draft, which was used by the Chiefs to select future Hall of Famer Buck Buchanan.
 Center Rodney Hudson was drafted by the Chiefs, and played there from 2011 to 2014, before signing with the Raiders in 2015.

Quotes

See also
 AFC West
 American Football League
 National Football League rivalries

Notes

References

Further reading

 Matthew C. Ehrlich, Kansas City vs. Oakland: The Bitter Sports Rivalry that Defined an Era. Champaign, IL: University of Illinois Press, 2019.

National Football League rivalries
Kansas City Chiefs
Las Vegas Raiders
Las Vegas Raiders rivalries
Kansas City Chiefs rivalries